A habit (or wont as a humorous and formal term) is a routine of behavior that is repeated regularly and tends to occur subconsciously.

The American Journal of Psychology (1903) defined a "habit, from the standpoint of psychology, [as] a more or less fixed  way of thinking, willing, or feeling acquired through previous repetition of a mental experience." Habitual behavior often goes unnoticed in persons exhibiting it, because a person does not need to engage in self-analysis when undertaking routine tasks. Habits are sometimes compulsory. A 2002 daily experience study by habit researcher Wendy Wood and her colleagues found that approximately 43% of daily behaviors are performed out of habit. New behaviours can become automatic through the process of habit formation. Old habits are hard to break and new habits are hard to form because the behavioural patterns which humans repeat become imprinted in neural pathways, but it is possible to form new habits through repetition.

When behaviors are repeated in a consistent context, there is an incremental increase in the link between the context and the action. This increases the automaticity of the behavior in that context. Features of an automatic behavior are all or some of: efficiency; lack of awareness; unintentionality; and uncontrollability.

History 
The word habit is pulled from the Latin words habere, which means "have, consist of," and habitus, which means "condition, or state of being." It also is derived from the French word habit, which means clothes. In the 13th century, the word habit first just referred to clothing. The meaning then progressed to the more common use of the word, which is "acquired mode of behavior."

In 1890, William James, a pioneering philosopher and psychologist, addressed the subject of habit in his book, The Principles of Psychology. James viewed habit as natural tendency in order to navigate life. To him, "living creatures...are bundles of habits" and those habits that have "an innate tendency are called instincts." James also explains how habits can govern our lives. He states, "Any sequence of mental action which has been frequently repeated tends to perpetuate itself; so that we find ourselves automatically prompted to think, feel, or do what we have been before accustomed to think, feel, or do, under like circumstances, without any consciously formed purpose, or anticipated of result."

Formation 
Habit formation is the process by which a behavior, through regular repetition, becomes automatic or habitual. This is modeled as an increase in automaticity with the number of repetitions up to an asymptote. This process of habit formation can be slow. Lally et al. (2010) found the average time for participants to reach the asymptote of automaticity was 66 days with a range of 18–254 days.

There are 3 main components to habit formation: the context cue, behavioral repetition, and the reward. The context cue can be a prior action, time of day, location, or anything that triggers the habitual behavior. This could be anything that one's mind associates with that habit, and one will automatically let a habit come to the surface. The behavior is the actual habit that one exhibits, and the reward, such as a positive feeling, therefore continues the "habit loop". A habit may initially be triggered by a goal, but over time that goal becomes less necessary and the habit becomes more automatic. Intermittent or uncertain rewards have been found to be particularly effective in promoting habit learning.

A variety of digital tools, online or mobile apps, have been introduced that are designed to support habit formation. For example, Habitica is a system that uses gamification, implementing strategies found in video games to real-life tasks by adding rewards such as experience and gold. However, a review of such tools suggests most are poorly designed with respect to theory and fail to support the development of automaticity.

Shopping habits are particularly vulnerable to change at "major life moments" like graduation, marriage, the birth of the first child, moving to a new home, and divorce.  Some stores use purchase data to try to detect these events and take advantage of the marketing opportunity.

Some habits are known as "keystone habits," and these influence the formation of other habits.  For example, identifying as the type of person who takes care of their body and is in the habit of exercising regularly, can also influence eating better and using credit cards less.  In business, safety can be a keystone habit that influences other habits that result in greater productivity.

A recent study by Adriaanse et al. (2014) found that habits mediate the relationship between self-control and unhealthy snack consumption. The results of the study empirically demonstrate that high self-control may influence the formation of habits and in turn affect behavior.

Goals 
The habit–goal interface or interaction is constrained by the particular manner in which habits are learned and represented in memory. Specifically, the associative learning underlying habits is characterized by the slow, incremental accrual of information over time in procedural memory. Habits can either benefit or hurt the goals a person sets for themselves.

Goals guide habits by providing the initial outcome-oriented motivation for response repetition. In this sense, habits are often a trace of past goal pursuit. Although, when a habit forces one action, but a conscious goal pushes for another action, an oppositional context occurs. When the habit prevails over the conscious goal, a capture error has taken place.

Behavior prediction is also derived from goals. Behavior prediction acknowledges the likelihood that a habit will form, but in order to form that habit, a goal must have been initially present. The influence of goals on habits is what makes a habit different from other automatic processes in the mind.

The following is a description of a classic goal devaluation experiment (from a Scientific American MIND guest blog post called Should Habits or Goals Direct Your Life? It Depends) which demonstrates the difference between goal-directed and habitual behavior: A series of elegant experiments conducted by Anthony Dickinson and colleagues in the early 1980s at the University of Cambridge in England clearly exposes the behavioral differences between goal-directed and habitual processes. Basically, in the training phase, a rat was trained to press a lever in order to receive some food. Then, in a second phase, the rat was placed in a different cage without a lever and was given the food, but it was made ill whenever it ate the food. This caused the rat to "devalue" the food, because it associated the food with being ill, without directly associating the action of pressing the lever with being ill. Finally, in the test phase, the rat was placed in the original cage with the lever. (To prevent additional learning, no food was delivered in the test phase.) Rats that had undergone an extensive training phase continued to press the lever in the test phase even though the food was devalued; their behavior was called habitual. Rats that had undergone a moderate training phase did not, and their behavior was called goal-directed. …  [G]oal-directed behavior is explained by the rat using an explicit prediction of the consequence, or outcome, of an action to select that action. If the rat wants the food, it presses the lever, because it predicts that pressing the lever will deliver the food. If the food has been devalued, the rat will not press the lever. Habitual behavior is explained by a strong association between an action and the situation from which the action was executed. The rat presses the lever when it sees the lever, not because of the predicted outcome.

Nervousness 
A number of habits can be classified as nervous habits. These include nail-biting, stammering, sniffling, and banging the head. They are known as symptoms of an emotional state and are generally based upon conditions of anxiety, insecurity, inferiority, and tension. These habits are often formed at a young age and may be due to a need for attention. When trying to overcome a nervous habit it is important to resolve the cause of the nervous feeling rather than the symptom which is a habit itself or a mountain as a result one could experience anxiety. Anxiety is a disorder known for excessive and unexpected worry that negatively impacts individuals' daily life and routines.

Bad habits 
A bad habit is an undesirable behavior pattern. Common examples include: procrastination, fidgeting, overspending, and nail-biting. The sooner one recognizes these bad habits, the easier it is to fix them. Rather than merely attempting to eliminate a bad habit, it may be more productive to seek to replace it with a healthier coping mechanism.

Will and intention 
A key factor in distinguishing a bad habit from an addiction or mental disease is willpower. If a person can easily control the behavior, then it is a habit. Good intentions can override the negative effect of bad habits, but their effect seems to be independent and additive—the bad habits remain, but are subdued rather than cancelled.

Elimination 

Many techniques exist for removing established bad habits, e.g., withdrawal of reinforcers—identifying and removing factors that trigger and reinforce the habit. The basal ganglia appears to remember the context that triggers a habit, so habits can be revived if triggers reappear. Recognizing and eliminating bad habits as soon as possible is advised. Habit elimination becomes more difficult with age because repetitions reinforce habits cumulatively over the lifespan. According to Charles Duhigg, there is a loop that includes a cue, routine, and reward for every habit. An example of a habit loop is TV program ends (cue), go to the fridge (routine), eat a snack (reward). The key to changing habits is to identify your cue and modify your routine and reward.

See also 

 Behavioral addiction
 Fixation (psychology)
 Habitus (disambiguation)
 Self control
 Tetris effect
 Vice
 Perseverance (virtue)

Habit modification approaches

 Behavior modification
 Cognitive behavioral therapy
 Habit reversal training
 Paradoxical intention

Behaviors with habitual elements

 Childhood obesity
 Nail-biting
 Neurodermatitis
 Nose-picking
 Obsessive-compulsive disorder
 Procrastination
 Thumb sucking
 Bulimia

References

Further reading
 Allen, James Sloan, ed. William James on Habit, Will, Truth, and the Meaning of Life. Frederic C. Beil, Publisher, 2014.
 Payne, Arthur F. "The Psychology of Nervous Habits." American Journal of Orthodontics and Oral Surgery 25, no. 4 (1939): 324.

External links 

 James Rowland Angell and Addison W. Moore. (1896) "Studies from the Psychological Laboratory of the University of Chicago: 1. Reaction-Time: A Study in Attention and Habit." Psychological Review 3, 245–258.
 "Should Habits or Goals Direct Your Life? It Depends." (Scientific American MIND blog post)
 

Habits